Kalateh-ye Sari (also Romanized as Kalāteh-ye Sarī and Kalāteh Sarī; also known as Sarī) is a village in Karghond Rural District, Nimbeluk District, Qaen County, South Khorasan Province, Iran. At the 2006 census, its population was 476, in 143 families.

References 

Populated places in Qaen County